Yevgeny Alexandrovich Dementyev (born 17 January 1983 in Tayozhny, Khanty–Mansi Autonomous Okrug) is a Russian cross-country skier. He attended Children and Youth Sports School of Sovetsky District, Khanty–Mansi Autonomous Okrug, where his first trainer was Valery Ukhov. Dementyev's first international success was in 2001 at the Junior World Championship. He won two medals at the 2006 Winter Olympics in Turin, with a gold in the men's 15 km + 15 km pursuit event and a silver in the men's 50 km freestyle mass start.

Dementyev finished 0.8 seconds behind the winner Giorgio Di Centa in the 50 km event, the closest margin of victory in Olympic history of this event. This margin of victory eclipsed the previous record of 4.9 seconds set at the 1984 Winter Olympics in Sarajevo between fellow Swedes Thomas Wassberg and Gunde Svan.

He also won two medals at the 2003 Nordic skiing World Junior Championships with a gold in 10 km and a bronze in the 30 km. Dementyev has two 4 × 10 km medals at the FIS Nordic World Ski Championships with a silver in 2007 and a bronze in 2005. His best individual finish at the FIS Nordic World Ski Championships was 22nd in the 15 km + 15 km double pursuit in 2005.

On 25 August 2009, Dementyev tested positive for recombinant erythropoietin (EPO). He returned in 2011 after a two-year ban but retired shortly thereafter.

Cross-country skiing results
All results are sourced from the International Ski Federation (FIS).

Olympic Games
 2 medals – (1 gold, 1 silver)

World Championships
 2 medals – (1 silver, 1 bronze)

World Cup

Season standings

Individual podiums
 1 victory – (1 )
 5 podiums – (5 )

Team podiums
 1 victory – (1 )
 4 podiums – (4 )

References

External links

1983 births
Living people
People from Khanty-Mansi Autonomous Okrug
Russian male cross-country skiers
Cross-country skiers at the 2006 Winter Olympics
Doping cases in cross-country skiing
Olympic cross-country skiers of Russia
Olympic gold medalists for Russia
Olympic silver medalists for Russia
Russian sportspeople in doping cases
Olympic medalists in cross-country skiing
FIS Nordic World Ski Championships medalists in cross-country skiing
Medalists at the 2006 Winter Olympics
Sportspeople from Khanty-Mansi Autonomous Okrug